FC Lokomotiv Kyiv is a football club from Kyiv, owned by the South Western Railway. It currently participates in various Kyiv city football competitions. It also fields several of its junior teams in the Ukrainian youth league.

History
Founded in 1919, as ZhelDor (abbr. -Rail road), soon after joining the Soviet Lokomotiv sports society it changed its name twice to Lokomotiv in 1936 and Lokomotiv Yuga in 1940. The team played its home games at its own stadium.

The best record of competition was the 17th place in the 1938 Soviet Top League. Also, the club was multiple winner of the Kyiv championships. In 1947, soon after the World War II the senior team was disbanded, it later appeared only on the amateur level (regional). During the World War II a lot of its players were mobilized and perished at the front-lines of the war.

At the present time, the club is known for good training of young talent and selling them to domestic and European clubs. The most successful players among them are Andriy Yarmolenko and Oleksandr Yakovenko, who played for Belgian side Anderlecht. The club participated in the Second League.

Current squad

League history

Notable players

 Andriy Yarmolenko (youth)
 Oleksandr Yakovenko (youth)
 Kyrylo Kovalets (youth)
 Anton Kanibolotskyi (youth)
 Oleksiy Dovhyi (youth)
 Oleh Synyohub (youth)
 Serhiy Shapoval (youth)
 Serhiy Herasymets (youth)
 Yuriy Shevel (youth)
 Oleh Kozishkurt (youth)
 Roman Yalovenko (youth)
 Oleksandr Shevchenko (youth)
 Mahomed Mameshev (youth)
 Makar Honcharenko
 Kostyantyn Fomin
 Mikhail Tovarovsky
 Viktor Melnyk
 Yuriy Klymchuk
 Kyrylo Romanyuk
 Yevheniy Shevchenko

References 
 Ukraine at Poland
 Profile at beachsoccer.com.ua
 Profile at beachsoccer.com.ua

External links 
 Kopanyi-Myach.info
 History of club at klisf.info
 Football Federation Of Kiev

 
Association football clubs established in 1919
Kyiv
Soviet Top League clubs
Football clubs in Kyiv
Lokomotiv (sports society)
Southwestern Railways
Amateur football clubs in Ukraine
Football clubs in the Ukrainian Soviet Socialist Republic